Otava is an island in the Archipelago Sea, Finland.

Finnish islands in the Baltic
Landforms of Southwest Finland